
Gmina Glinojeck is an urban-rural gmina (administrative district) in Ciechanów County, Masovian Voivodeship, in east-central Poland.

Villages
Apart from the town of Glinojeck, Gmina Glinojeck contains the villages and settlements of Bielawy, Brody Młockie, Budy Rumockie, Dreglin, Dukt, Działy, Faustynowo, Gałczyn, Huta, Janowo, Juliszewo, Kamionka, Kondrajec Pański, Kondrajec Szlachecki, Kowalewko, Krusz, Lipiny, Luszewo, Malużyn, Nowy Garwarz, Ogonowo, Ościsłowo, Pieńki Faustynowskie, Płaciszewo, Rumoka, Sadek, Śródborze, Stary Garwarz, Strzeszewo, Sulerzyż, Szyjki, Szyjki Stare, Wkra, Wkra-Kolonia, Wola Młocka, Wólka Garwarska, Zalesie, Zawiłka, Żeleźnia and Zygmuntowo.

Neighbouring gminas
Gmina Glinojeck is bordered by the gminas of Baboszewo, Ciechanów, Ojrzeń, Raciąż, Sochocin and Strzegowo.

References

Polish official population figures 2006

Glinojeck
Ciechanów County